Mike Morris (born April 22, 2001) is an American football defensive end for the Michigan Wolverines.

College career
Morris attended American Heritage School in Florida. He originally committed to Florida State University to play college football before switching to the University of Michigan.

Morris played in only one game his first two years at Michigan in 2019 and 2020. In 2021, he appeared in 14 games and made four starts, recording 16 tackles, 0.5 sacks and one interception. He became a full-time starter in 2022.

References

External links
 Michigan profile

2001 births
Living people
American football defensive ends
Michigan Wolverines football players
Players of American football from Florida